John A. Pilch (July 11, 1925 – June 14, 1991) was a National Basketball Association (NBA) player. He played basketball at the University of Wyoming from 1947–50. During that time, he was Wyoming's leading scorer. In his senior season, John averaged 11.5 points per game and was selected as an All-American basketball player.  John was drafted in the second round of the 1950 NBA Draft by the Baltimore Bullets. He played in one NBA season with the Minneapolis Lakers, 0.6 points and 1 rebound per game. In 1999, John was posthumously inducted into the University of Wyoming Athletics Hall of Fame.

References

1925 births
1991 deaths
All-American college men's basketball players
American men's basketball players
Baltimore Bullets (1944–1954) draft picks
Basketball players from Wyoming
Forwards (basketball)
Minneapolis Lakers players
People from Sheridan, Wyoming
Wyoming Cowboys basketball players